The Premios 40 Principales for Best America International Act is an honor presented annually at Los Premios 40 Principales América, a ceremony that recognizes excellence, creates a greater awareness of cultural diversity and contributions of Latino artists in the international scene.

This is a list of the Premios 40 Principales América winners and nominees for Best International Act.

References

External links
 

Spanish awards
Spanish music
Latin American music
European music awards